Efthymis Kouloucheris (born 10 March 1981) is a Greek former footballer who played as a centre back .

Career

He started his career at Proodeftiki FC and later at Olympiakos. He was transferred to Aris Thessaloniki F.C. in January 2006.
He scored his first goal for the club with a header against Xanthi FC in a match which ended 1–0. Before the beginning of 2012 he terminated his contract with the club.
In January 2012 Efthimios Kouloucheris signed a new contract with Panionios until 30.06.2013 .

Honours

Club
Olympiacos
Greek Championship:  2003, 2005
Greek Cup: 2005

References

1981 births
Living people
Greek footballers
Aris Thessaloniki F.C. players
Olympiacos F.C. players
Proodeftiki F.C. players
Panionios F.C. players
Super League Greece players
Association football defenders
Footballers from Karditsa